The Men's points race competition at the 2017 World Championships was held on 14 April 2017.

Results
120 laps (30 km) were raced with 12 sprints.

References

Men's points race
UCI Track Cycling World Championships – Men's points race